Farrukh Amonatov (born 13 April 1978 in Dushanbe) is a chess grandmaster. Along with Magaram Magomedov, they are the only Grandmasters of Tajikistan. Amonatov is also the winner of many international tournaments and recently won the Mumbai Mayors Cup 2019. Despite living and training in Moscow, he represents Tajikistan in international tournaments. Amonatov is the official coach of the Russian Juniors chess team and conducts chess camps with talented juniors from all over the world.

Amonatov was the Asian under-16 champion in 1992. He won the inaugural Moscow Open in 2005. Later that year Amonatov competed in the FIDE World Cup, where he knocked out Michał Krasenkow in the first round and then was eliminated in the second by Magnus Carlsen.
In 2007 he qualified for the Superfinal of the Russian Chess Championship and finished 10th. In 2008 Amonatov tied for first place with Anton Filippov and Vitaly Tseshkovsky in the 2nd Georgy Agzamov Memorial in Tashkent, winning the tournament on tiebreak.
He took part in the 2009 FIDE World Cup, where he reached the second round, in which he lost to the eventual winner, Boris Gelfand. In 2015 Amonatov tied for 1st–3rd with Rinat Jumabayev and Petr Kostenko at the 4th Central Asia Chess Cup in Almaty, finishing second on tiebreak. The following year, Amonatov won for the second time the Agzamov Memorial (on tiebreak from Rauf Mamedov), and also won the Eurasian Blitz Cup of the President of Kazakhstan, held in Almaty, edging out on tiebreak (number of wins) Ian Nepomniachtchi.

References

External links

1978 births
Living people
Tajikistani chess players
Russian chess players
Chess grandmasters
Russian people of Tajikistani descent
People from Dushanbe